Mad Trax is a racing game developed by RayLand Interactive and published by Project Two Interactive BV in North America in 1998.

Reception

References

External links
 The Adrenaline Vault review
 Game Over review
 AllGame review

1998 video games
Racing video games
Science fiction racing games
Vehicular combat games
Video games developed in France
Windows games
Windows-only games